Van Parys is a surname. Notable people with the surname include:

Annelies Van Parys (born 1975), Belgian composer
Georges Van Parys (1902–1971), French composer
Germaine Van Parys (1893–1983), Belgian photojournalist
Tony Van Parys (born 1951), Belgian politician

Surnames of Dutch origin